Donal Patrick Michael Barrington (28 February 1928 – 3 January 2018) was an Irish judge who served as a Judge of the Supreme Court from 1996 to 2000, a Judge of the European Court of Justice from 1989 to 1996 and a Judge of the High Court from 1979 to 1989.

He was known to be an advocate for progressive policies, he was also the first President of the Irish Human Rights Commission.

As a barrister, he was a key advocate for social change. He successfully represented Mary McGee, in the landmark 1973 case over the ban on importing contraceptives in Ireland, in which the Supreme Court ruled that the ban infringed on married couples' right to privacy. He was appointed a High Court judge in 1979 and subsequently a judge of the Court of First Instance of the Court of Justice of the European Communities in 1989.

Early life
Barrington was born in North Dublin, the fifth child of Thomas Barrington, a principal officer in the Department of Agriculture and native of Ennistymon, County Clare, and Eileen, a daughter of J. K. Bracken and sister of Brendan Bracken, 1st Viscount Bracken. His father died when he was 2 years old. He later attended University College Dublin.

Family
Barrington married Eileen O'Donovan, daughter of Irish senator Seán O'Donovan and Kathleen Boland, sister of Gerald Boland and Harry Boland. They had four children, Kathleen, Kevin, Eileen and Brian.

References

People from South Dublin (county)
1928 births
2018 deaths
20th-century Irish lawyers
Judges of the Supreme Court of Ireland
Alumni of Trinity College Dublin
European Court of Justice judges
Irish judges of international courts and tribunals
People educated at Belvedere College